Ngau Tam Mei, also known as Yau Tam Mei, is a suburb located in San Tin, New Territories, Hong Kong near Yuen Long. It is located at the east of Fairview Park, the north of San Tin village and Kai Kung Leng, the northwest of Lam Tsuen Country Park, and also at the northeast of Nam Sang Wai.

Features
Wat Buddhadhamaram (วัดพุทธธรรมาราม), the oldest Thai temple in Hong Kong, is located in Ngau Tam Mei.

Traffic 
Since there is no MTR stations in Ngau Tam Mei, people living in Ngau Tam Mei mainly travel on minibuses, buses and also on bicycle. There are three main roads in Ngau Tam Mei, which are: Ngau Tam Mei Road, San Tin Highway and Castle Peak Road. Moreover, a proposed railway station, namely Ngau Tam Mei station, may be built in Ngau Tam Mei in the future to serve the local residents.

Education
Yau Tam Mei is in Primary One Admission (POA) School Net 74. Within the school net are multiple aided schools (operated independently but funded with government money) and one government school: Yuen Long Government Primary School (元朗官立小學).

Future developments

Railway

The Guangzhou–Shenzhen–Hong Kong Express Rail Link Hong Kong section which is currently under construction will pass through Ngau Tam Mei. In addition, an Ngau Tam Mei station is also proposed as an intermediate station of the MTR Northern Link provided that significant development can be seen in the surrounding areas.

See also
 Wai Tsai Tsuen, a village located in the Ngau Tam Mei area

References 
This article draws some information from the corresponding article in Chinese Wikipedia.

Further reading

External links

 Delineation of area of existing village Yau Tam Mei (I) (San Tin) for election of resident representative (2019 to 2022)
 Delineation of area of existing village Yau Tam Mei (II) (San Tin) for election of resident representative (2019 to 2022)
 Antiquities Advisory Board. Historic Building Appraisal. Wai Cheung Ancestral Hall, Yau Tam Mei Tsuen Pictures

Areas of Hong Kong
Yuen Long District
Populated places in Hong Kong